Síofra Cléirigh Büttner (born 21 July 1995) is an Irish middle-distance runner.

Early life
Cléirigh Büttner grew up in Dublin and attended Coláiste Íosagáin, Booterstown. Her parents are Merv Büttner and Fiona Ní Chléirigh. She won a silver medal in the girls' 1500m at the 2011 European Youth Olympics.

Career
Cléirigh Büttner attends Villanova University, Pennsylvania, and won a rare "triple" at the Penn Relays: Distance medley relay, 4 × 800 metres and 4 × 1500 metres. She ran the 800 metres at the 2017 World Championships in Athletics.

References

External links
 
 
 
 
 
 

1995 births
Living people
Irish female middle-distance runners
World Athletics Championships athletes for Ireland
Villanova Wildcats women's track and field athletes
Sportspeople from Dublin (city)
Athletes (track and field) at the 2020 Summer Olympics
Olympic athletes of Ireland